Sanz is a Spanish surname that may refer to
Ainara Sanz (born 1995), Spanish professional racing cyclist
Aitor Sanz (born 1984), Spanish professional footballer
Alejandro Sanz (born 1968), Spanish pop musician
Ángel Sanz Briz (1910–1980), Spanish diplomat 
Antonio Sanz (born 1968), Spanish lawyer and politician
Carlos Sanz, American actor
Crickette Sanz, American scientist
Enrique Sanz (born 1989), Spanish professional cyclist
Ernesto Sanz (born 1956), Argentine politician
Fernand Sanz (1881–1925), French cyclist
Fernando Sanz (born 1974), Spanish footballer
Francisco Javier Sanz Alonso (1952–2022), Spanish chess master
Francisco Sanz, Spanish actor
Francisco Sanz Fernández (born 1952), Spanish politician
Gaël Sanz (born 1977), French football defender
Gaspar Sanz (1640–1710), Spanish composer and priest
Henri Sanz (born 1963), French rugby union player
Horatio Sanz (born 1969), Chilean-born American actor and comedian
Ignacio Sanz (born 1955), Spanish Olympic judoka
Jacobo Sanz Ovejero (born 1983), Spanish footballer
Javier Sanz (born 1953), Spanish sprint canoer
Jenna Sanz-Agero, American singer
Jesús María Sanz-Serna (born 1953), Spanish mathematician
Jorge Sanz (born 1969), Spanish actor
Jorge Sanz (basketball) (born 1993), Spanish basketball player
José Antonio de Artigas Sanz (1887–?), Spanish engineer
Laia Sanz (born 1985), Spanish sportswoman
Lorenzo Sanz (1943–2020), Spanish businessman
Mariano Sanz (born 1989), Spanish footballer
Marta Sanz (born 1967), Spanish writer
Marta Sanz-Solé (born 1952), Spanish mathematician
Miguel Sanz (born 1952), Spanish politician
Miguel José Sanz (1756–1814), Venezuelan lawyer and journalist
Miguel Sanz, Spanish politician, President of the autonomous community of Navarre
Paul L. Oostburg Sanz (born 1969), United States General Counsel of the Navy
Pedro Sanz Alonso (born 1953), Spanish politician
Peter Sanz (1680–1747), Catalan Dominican friar
Rita Sanz-Agero (born 1991), modern pentathlete from Guatemala
Rocío Sanz Quirós (1934–1993), Costa Rican composer
Rubén Sanz (born 1980), Spanish professional footballer 
Salvador López Sanz (1924–2009), Spanish politician
Santiago Sanz, Paralympic athlete from Spain
Vidal Francisco Soberón Sanz (born 1953), admiral of the Mexican Navy

Spanish-language surnames